Loxostege deliblatica is a species of moth in the family Crambidae. It is found from Europe (Italy, Austria, the Czech Republic, Hungary, Croatia, Hungary, Romania, Bulgaria, the Republic of Macedonia, Greece and Russia), through Turkey and Central Asia (including Kyrgyzstan and Kazakhstan) to China.

The wingspan is about 23 mm. Adults have light yellow forewings and whitish hindwings.

References

Moths described in 1942
Pyraustinae
Moths of Europe
Moths of Asia